"In My Place" is a song by British rock band Coldplay. The song was written collaboratively by all the band members for their second album, A Rush of Blood to the Head. The track is built around thumping drums and chiming guitars. It was released on 5 August 2002 as the lead single from A Rush of Blood to the Head and reached number two on the UK Singles Chart. The song also reached number 17 on Billboards Modern Rock Tracks.

"In My Place" was well received by critics, who complimented its arrangement and profound lyrics. The song won the award for Best Rock Performance by a Duo or Group with Vocal at the 45th Annual Grammy Awards.

Background and composition

In an interview with Q magazine, lead singer Chris Martin stated that "In My Place" was a song Coldplay had left after recording their debut album Parachutes (2000). When the band finished recording their second album A Rush of Blood to the Head, Martin said that the album was complete. However, after guitarist Jonny Buckland played the song on his guitar, Martin said that they now needed to record it and include it on the album. Martin also said that: "That's about where you're put in the world, and how you're given your position, and the way you look, and how you have to get on with it." In an interview, Buckland revealed that the song was hard to record, as the band had played the song live. He also commented that when they started recording the song, they did not know how it should sound, due to the band members' contrasting ideas.

The song opens with a single crash cymbal followed by two bars of 4/4 drumming, then a plaintive three-note guitar line rings through a strummy rhythm, and Martin's vocals. Its instrumentation is varied with the sound of thumping drums, chiming guitars, a singalong chorus, and a string arrangement. The song also features guitar licks. The lyrics emphasise: "But I wait for you/if you go, if you go/leave me down here on my own/then I'll wait for you." The song's lyrics also include references to a desire for weary optimism.

The song is written in the key of A major. It has been noted that the song's drum intro bears a close resemblance to the beginning of the Ride song "Dreams Burn Down".

Critical reception

Critics were positive towards the song. In the Entertainment Weekly review of the album, critic David Browne wrote: "Songs like 'In My Place' and 'Warning Sign' marry lyrics imbued with deep regret and mistakes (''...You were an island / And I passed you by'' in the touching latter song) with lyrical melodies and guitar hooks that twinkle and sparkle." Adrien Begrand of PopMatters wrote: "When the shimmering, pretty lead-off single 'In My Place' represents the album's weakest moment, you know you've got something extraordinary. Currently storming the charts a la 'Yellow', 'In My Place' is another surprisingly simple song, carried by Jonny Buckland's chiming guitar and Chris Martin’s heartfelt vocals. It really shouldn't amount to much, but Coldplay make it work very well. When Martin sings, "Please, please, please/Come back and sing to me," he totally sells it, and you buy it. And why not? The song's lovely.

Amy M. Bruce of The Towerlight wrote: "With a slew of introspective rock songs like 'In My Place' and 'God Put a Smile upon Your Face,' this album is worthy of the hype surrounding the band's first album." Jules Willis of the BBC wrote: "The second track, the first written post-Parachutes and sounding like a refugee from that album, is the grower 'In My Place'. It's a fantastic pop tune that justifies Coldplay's status as one of UK's most exciting bands." The A.V. Club and NME ranked the song at number 14 and 43, respectively, on their "Best Songs of 2002" lists.

Release and commercial performance 
Coldplay released "In My Place" in the US and UK on 5 August 2002 as the album's lead single. The single was pressed with two B-sides: "One I Love" and "I Bloom Blaum". The single cover features Buckland, with art directed by Sølve Sundsbø.

"In My Place" peaked at number two on UK Singles Chart on 17 August 2002, kept off the top by "Colourblind" by Darius Danesh. It spent one week on the top 10 and stayed in the chart until 23 November 2002. The song re-entered the UK top 40 in July 2011. The song reached number seventeen on Billboard's Hot Modern Rock Tracks in 2002. The band were yet to have a number one single. In 2005, "Speed of Sound", the lead single of the band's third album, X&Y, also reached number two, but never the number one position. "Speed of Sound" was marked as Coldplay's most successful single until "Viva la Vida", reached number one in 2008.

Music video
The music video for "In My Place" was directed by Sophie Muller. It debuted on 17 June 2002 on AOL. It features the band playing in a huge, nearly empty, white studio room, with a bluish light resembling sunlight coming from an off-screen source. The video starts off with a closeup of Will Champion playing the drums as the song begins; while the rest of the band plays, Chris Martin, who is sitting in a corner, gets up and joins them in the song. Throughout the video, Martin sings directly to the camera, interspersed with shots of the other members of the band playing their instruments. During the guitar solo, Martin runs up to two women who are seen sitting on a step in the background, talks to them for a while, and then runs back to sing the rest of the song. The two women in the background were members of the video crew: a makeup artist/wardrobe assistant and the video commissioner.

The video was subjected to a spoof by Bad Lip Reading on their YouTube page. It was dubbed with the song "Yeti" that was composed and recorded, like BLR's other videos, to humorously reinterpret the lip movement and action in the video. "Yeti" has received over three million views on YouTube as of April 2017.

Awards
"In My Place" won a Grammy Award in the category of Best Rock Performance by a Duo or Group with Vocal at the 2003 Grammy Awards. The song was nominated for two MuchMusic Video Awards for Best international video–group and People's Choice: Favorite international group.

Usage in media
In 2003, "In My Place" was featured on Coldplay's live album, Live 2003. In 2012, "In My Place" was featured on Coldplay's live album Live 2012. The song appeared in the 2006 episode "Saving Sammy" on CBS' television series Cold Case. The song was used as a closing montage song about a case from 2003. The track appeared again on an episode of the television series Fastlane. The song is also featured in as playable in Guitar Hero 5.

Track listing
All versions of the official single included the B-side, "One I Love". This track was regularly performed on the subsequent A Rush of Blood to the Head Tour and is also featured on the Coldplay Live 2003 DVD.

Personnel
 Chris Martin – lead vocals, organ, keyboards 
 Jonny Buckland – electric guitars
 Guy Berryman – bass guitar
 Will Champion – drums, percussion, backing vocals
 Audrey Riley - string arrangement

Charts and certifications

Weekly charts

Year-end charts

Certifications

Release history

References

Literature
 Roach, Martin (2003). Coldplay: Nobody Said It Was Easy. Omnibus Press. .

2002 singles
Coldplay songs
Capitol Records singles
Parlophone singles
Music videos directed by Sophie Muller
Song recordings produced by Ken Nelson (British record producer)
Songs written by Guy Berryman
Songs written by Jonny Buckland
Songs written by Will Champion
Songs written by Chris Martin